Thomas Hall is an American politician serving as a member of the Ohio House of Representatives for the 46th district. He was elected in 2020, defeating Democrat Michelle Novak with 68% of the vote.

References

Living people
Republican Party members of the Ohio House of Representatives
21st-century American politicians
Year of birth missing (living people)
People from Butler County, Ohio